Exton station is a train station in Exton, West Whiteland Township, Pennsylvania, in the western suburbs of Philadelphia. It is served by most Amtrak Keystone Service trains and one daily eastbound Pennsylvanian trip, as well as SEPTA's Paoli/Thorndale Line.

This station is wheelchair-accessible with high-level platforms on both sides of the tracks. This is 27.7 track miles from Philadelphia's Suburban Station. In 2017, the average total SEPTA weekday boardings at this station was 627, and the average total weekday SEPTA alightings was 522.

History
In late 2013, SEPTA developed renderings of a proposed station improvement plan.  The plan calls for near-full-length high-level boarding platforms on the inbound and outbound side of the tracks, a station building to be used as a waiting area, an extended exterior waiting canopy, as well as open-air shelters with glass windscreens.

Station layout
There is no ticket office at the station. Unlike other stations served by SEPTA Paoli/Thorndale Line trains west of Philadelphia along the former Pennsylvania Railroad Main Line, the station is not located within the built-up portion of the community; it is merely a park-and-ride station along PA 100, near the highway's interchange with U.S. Route 30. There are 643 parking spaces at the station. Parking was last expanded in late 2009.

Exton has two high-level side platforms. A center track is occasionally used for Norfolk Southern freight trains passing through the station.

Gallery

References

External links

Exton Station – SEPTA
Exton Amtrak-SEPTA Station (USA Rail Guide – Train Web)

SEPTA Regional Rail stations
Former Pennsylvania Railroad stations
Amtrak stations in Pennsylvania
Railway stations in Chester County, Pennsylvania
Philadelphia to Harrisburg Main Line
Railway stations in the United States opened in 1981